Acantholomidea is a genus of shield-backed bugs in the family Scutelleridae. There are at least two described species in Acantholomidea.

Species
These two species belong to the genus Acantholomidea:
 Acantholomidea denticulata (Stål, 1870)
 Acantholomidea porosa

References

Further reading

 
 
 

Scutelleridae
Articles created by Qbugbot
Pentatomomorpha genera